Tovar Municipality may refer to:
 Tovar Municipality, Aragua
 Tovar Municipality, Mérida

Municipality name disambiguation pages